Guayama FC Stadium was a proposed soccer-specific stadium which is to be located in the Guayama Sports Complex of Guayama, Puerto Rico near a plot of land adjacent to the Athletic Court Doctor Roberto Monroig, which is currently used exclusively for the practice of football. The construction for the new stadium was scheduled to begin to be built in time for the 2014 season. As for the name of the stadium, the mayor confirmed that it has already been proposed by several groups that it should bear the name of Doctor Roberto Monroig.

Design

The project is being designed by Cabrera Architects. The proposed capacity of the stadium would be around 1,500 spectators of natural grass, but can be expanded to 2,000 . Its features are similar to that of the great stadiums which will have; a Club House for VIP, conference area, clubhouse amenities with Space for 25 lockers for players and transmission booths for press, radio, television, and two designated areas to give soccer lessons.

Gallery

History

Back in 2013, the municipal government of Guayama, together with governor Alejandro García Padilla, announced the construction of a new football stadium for Guayama, Puerto Rico. The proposed stadium will be located on land attached to the Pista Atlética Doctor Roberto Monroig, which is currently used exclusively for soccer practice. The proposed stadium was a campaign promise of the mayor, according to the chief executive of Guayama, and the central government has committed $3 million for the project. The rest of the proposed project would be financed by a loan from the Government Development Bank of the Commonwealth of Puerto Rico. The stadium's capacity would be around about 1,500 spectators natural grass, and it will have a VIP area, and two areas designated to teach football.

In June 2016, The stadium was constructed at the sports complex of Guayama, where the Coliseum Roque Nido, the Marcelino Blondet stadium, an athletics track and a small basketball court and handball is. The work is in charge of the company OIB and designed by the architectural firm career, Guaynabo. Field measurements will be 110 by 70 meters, suitable for all local and international event while will have a power plant that will prevent matches are canceled in the event of a power failure in Guayama. The building began construction in December 2015 and will be available for the month of December 2016.

Controversies

In November 2015, Puerto Rico accumulation senator belonging to the Puerto Rican Independence Party, the Hon. Maria de Lourdes Santiago, in a press release criticized the allocation of $1 million for the construction of the new football stadium Guayama. "It is absolutely outrageous and offensive that at a time when the closure of 580 schools to reduce costs is proposed, most of the Popular Party deems prudent to use the money of the workers of Puerto Rico for assignments like (these)" subtracts the statement released by Senator's office with a list of works that includes the football stadium Guayama.

External links
Cabera Architects : http://www.carrera-arq.com/estadio-guayama.html

References

2016 establishments in Puerto Rico
Football venues in Puerto Rico
Guayama, Puerto Rico